William Esdaile (6 February 1758 – 2 October 1837 in Clapham), was an English banker and print collector.

Esdaile was the fourth son of Sir James Esdaile of Great Gains, Essex, lord mayor of London, by his second wife, Mary Mayor. He received a commercial education, and was placed as a clerk in the banking-house of Ladbrooke & Co. In or about 1780 Sir James Esdaile was induced by his son-in-law, Sir Benjamin Hammet, to found with him a new banking business, and on its formation William Esdaile transferred his services to the house of Esdaile, Hammet, & Co., 21 Lombard Street.

Esdaile's son describes his appearance at work in a private journal: 

The business prospered under his care, and, finding money at his command, Esdaile widened the scope of his tastes, and began to frequent sales of prints. His earlier purchases were sparing and cheap, but, distrusting his own judgment, he engaged a professional assistant, accompanied by whom he attended all the great auctions in London. Though prints formed the bulk of his collection, he also largely purchased, as opportunity offered, coins, china, books, and the general miscellanea of the sale-room. Towards the last few years of his life, when his mind was breaking up, he abandoned his usual caution, and spent on a large and sometimes reckless scale, greatly to the advantage of his collection, which was considered one of the most valuable in England. It was sold after his death, the sale extending over sixteen days. The chief attractions were the very complete set of Rembrandt etchings and Claude drawings, which Esdaile had bought on the dispersal of Sir Thomas Lawrence's collection, and a large selection from the best work of the early Italian engravers.

In 1825, at the age of sixty-eight, Esdaile took his first trip abroad, visiting Italy, and was so pleased with the experiment that he repeated it two years later. In 1832, on returning to his home at Clapham from Dover, he was seized with a dangerous malarial fever. Though he recovered his health, he was never again able to attend to business or to manage his property. He neither read nor wrote, and spent the whole day in overlooking his collection of prints. He passed the winter of 1835–36 at Rome and Naples, but after his return his constitution began to gradually break up. He was confined to his bed for nine months, and, dying at Clapham, 2 October 1837, was buried in Bunhill Fields. The banking-house of Esdaile & Hammet had ceased to exist from the beginning of the year. Esdaile's portrait was painted by both Wilkie and Lawrence, and an engraving was made from another picture by George Sharples. He married Elizabeth, the only child of Edward Jeffries, treasurer of St. Thomas's Hospital, by whom he had two sons and four daughters. Their grandson, Edward Jeffries Esdaile, married, 27 September 1837, Ianthe Eliza Shelley, the daughter of Percy Bysshe Shelley and Harriet Westbrook.

References

1758 births
1837 deaths
18th-century English people
19th-century English people
English bankers
English art collectors